Friedrich Held (21 July 1812 – 25 January 1872) was a German malacologist. His name is honoured by the research organization Friedrich Held Gesellschaft Verein zur Förderung der wissenschaftlichen Weichtierkunde e.V.

Works
Held F. 1836. Aufzählung der in Bayern lebenden Mollusken Isis 1836 (4): 271-282. Leipzig.
Held, F. 1837 Notizen über die Weichthiere Bayerns Isis 1837 (4): 303-309. Leipzig.
Held, F. 1838. Notizen über die Weichthiere Bayerns (Fortsetzung) Isis 1837 (12): 902-919. Leipzig.
All digitised at AnimalBase

References

Biographical Etymology of Marine Organism Names
Zilch, A.,1967 Geschichte der malakologischen Sektion. Aus der Geschichte des Senckenberg-Museums, Nr. 13. Archiv für Molluskenkunde 97: 7-43. Biography, handwriting.

German malacologists
1872 deaths
1812 births